Emptage is an English surname. Notable people with the surname include:

 Albert Emptage (1917–1997), English footballer
 Commodore George Emptage (1733–1785), English seaman

Surnames of English origin